Gregory Scott Glasson (born December 6, 1974) is an American bass player. He has played bass for Grammy Award winning artist Seal both live onstage and in studio recordings. Glasson is also widely known as a solid session player, and has been featured on numerous albums, for a variety of artists. Mostly sought after in the Pop rock field, Glasson has played on major label tracks for artists such as Seal, Alanis Morissette and producer Josh Harris.

Born in Princeton, New Jersey, Glasson grew up in Pennington, New Jersey and graduated from Hopewell Valley Central High School, before attending the University of Maine. At the age 19 he was on the road playing with 90's roots rock act Dear Liza opening for Blues Traveler  on their multiplatinum Four tour, as well as extensive tours with Derek Trucks Band and a handful of dates on the traveling 90's festival H.O.R.D.E.

A decade of touring and recording led to more session work for major labels and indie bands in NH. Greg currently plays full-time with Mother Superior & The Sliding Royales and Tan Vampires.

References

External links 
Greg Glasson Official Website

1974 births
Living people
Guitarists from New Jersey
Hopewell Valley Central High School alumni
People from Pennington, New Jersey
People from Princeton, New Jersey
University of Maine alumni
21st-century American bass guitarists